Muhammad Bashir Jehangiri Swati (born 1 February 1937) was Chief Justice of the Supreme Court of Pakistan from 7 January 2002 to 31 January 2002. Previously, he served as Chief Justice of the Peshawar High Court.

See also
 Chief Justices of Pakistan

References

 

1937 births
Chief justices of Pakistan
Living people
Pakistani judges
People from Mansehra District
Chief Justices of the Peshawar High Court
University of Peshawar alumni